The Ferrari F154 is a family of modular twin-turbocharged, direct injected V8 petrol engines designed and produced by Ferrari since 2013. It is a replacement for the naturally aspirated Ferrari/Maserati F136 V8 family on both Maserati and Ferrari cars.
They are the first turbocharged Ferrari road engines since the 1987 2.9-litre F120A V8 of the Ferrari F40.

Description

The F154 V8 engines have a 90° angle between the cylinder banks, aluminium block and heads. The forced induction system uses two parallel twin-scroll water-cooled turbochargers supplied by IHI and two air-to-air intercoolers. The valvetrain consists of 4 valves per cylinder actuated through roller finger followers by two overhead camshafts per bank; the timing chain is located on the flywheel side. All Ferrari versions feature gasoline direct injection and continuously variable valve timing on both intake and exhaust side. 

The Ferrari version of the engine has a flatplane crankshaft and dry sump lubrication. In order to obtain equal length pipes, the exhaust manifolds are manufactured from multiple welded cast steel pieces; the turbocharger housing uses a similar three-piece construction.

The Maserati version has a crossplane crankshaft and wet sump lubrication. Turbine housings and exhaust manifolds are integrated in a single piece.

Alfa Romeo's variant, the 690T, found in the Giulia Quadrifoglio and Stelvio Quadrifoglio models, is manufactured at Stellantis' Termoli engine plant. This variant uses single-scroll rather than twin-scroll turbos. Alfa also added mechanical cylinder deactivation to the right bank for increased highway fuel efficiency. Additionally, from 2020 onwards, Alfa added port direct injection, doubling the number of injectors to 12.

Applications

Ferrari

Maserati

Alfa Romeo V6

Awards

The F154B and F154C engines have won a total of 14 awards in the International Engine of the Year competition, including a record of four consecutive overall titles between 2016 and 2019 and additional four Best Performance Engine titles. The powerplant also won the 2016 Best New Engine recognition at his debut. Between 2016 and 2018 the engine was classified at the first place in the 3-to-4 litre class. Following the adoption of new power-based categories instead of the previous ones based on displacement, in 2019 the F154 variants won both 550 to 650 PS and Above 650 PS awards.

In 2018 the F154C engine was crowned Best of the best as the most significant engine since the launch of the International Engine of the Year in 1999.

See also
List of Ferrari engines

References 

Ferrari engines
Gasoline engines by model
V8 engines